Norman J. MacLeod (8 October 1904 - 7 October 1951) was an Australian rules footballer who played for Collingwood in the Victorian Football League (VFL) during the late 1920s and early 1930s.

MacLeod, a wingman, appeared in the opening three rounds of the 1927 VFL season but didn't play another game after that until the following year. In just his 18th league game, MacLeod became a premiership player when he was a member of the Collingwood side which defeated Richmond in the 1928 Grand Final.

References

Holmesby, Russell and Main, Jim (2007). The Encyclopedia of AFL Footballers. 7th ed. Melbourne: Bas Publishing.

1904 births
Australian rules footballers from Victoria (Australia)
Collingwood Football Club players
Collingwood Football Club Premiership players
1951 deaths
One-time VFL/AFL Premiership players